Linskey is a surname. Notable people with the surname include:

Frank Linskey (1913–1999), American basketball player and coach
Howard Linskey (born 1967), British novelist and former journalist

See also
Liney
Linsky